Luis Alberto Reyna Navarro (born 16 May 1959) is a Peruvian football midfielder who played for Peru in the 1982 FIFA World Cup.

Career
He earned 39 caps, scoring 1 goal between 1980 and 1989. He also played for Sporting Cristal.

References

External links

FIFA profile

1959 births
Living people
People from Huánuco
Association football midfielders
Peruvian footballers
Peru international footballers
Peruvian Primera División players
Sporting Cristal footballers
Club Universitario de Deportes footballers
1982 FIFA World Cup players
1987 Copa América players
Sporting Cristal managers
Peruvian football managers